Nils Andersson (born October 15, 1991) is a Swedish former professional ice hockey defenceman. He last played with HV71 in the Swedish Hockey League (SHL).

Playing originally with the Växjö Lakers, Andersson made his Elitserien debut on September 13, 2011.

References

External links
 

1991 births
IF Björklöven players
Djurgårdens IF Hockey players
HV71 players
Living people
Malmö Redhawks players
Swedish ice hockey defencemen
Växjö Lakers players
Sportspeople from Umeå